Västerslätt is a residential area in Umeå, Sweden.

External links
Västerslätt at Umeå Municipality

Umeå